Yohmor may refer to:

Yohmor, Beqaa, Lebanon
Yohmor, Nabatieh, Lebanon